Paattu Padava is a 1995 Indian Tamil-language romantic drama film directed by B. R. Vijayalakshmi in her debut. The film stars S. P. Balasubrahmanyam, Rahman and newcomer Lavanya Rajesh, with Janagaraj, Kalyan Kumar, Mohan Natarajan, Chinni Jayanth, Srividya, C. R. Saraswathi and Sabitha Anand playing supporting roles. It was released on 10 February 1995, and was an average grosser at the box office.

Plot 

Rishi is a doctor in a mental hospital and treats his patients like his family. Rangarajan is the director of the mental hospital. Devi, daughter of a wealthy man, is a social worker and joyful woman. Murali acts like a mental patient and mute person in the mental hospital, only Rangarajan knows that he is perfectly fine.

Devi starts visiting the mental hospital very often. After few quarrels with Rishi, Devi becomes good friends with Rishi. She is intrigued by Murali and starts spending a lot of time with him. Murali slowly falls in one-sided love with Devi. While Rishi and Devi express their love and they fall in love with each other. Everything goes well until Devi finds out that Murali is perfectly alright. Rangarajan reveals Murali's tragic past to her.

In the past, Murali lived happily with his parents. His parents did love marriage and they didn't have the support of their family. One day, his mother Janaki was arrested for procurement and the complaint was made by his father Gangadharan. His father then fled of the village alone, Murali was down and out. People thought he was a mentally ill boy so they sent him to Rangarajan's mental hospital. Later, his mother died in jail. The kind-hearted Rangarajan decided to keep Murali in his mental hospital, he brought him like his own child.

Feeling hurt and vexed by life, Murali leaves the mental hospital without informing anyone. They finally find him in the street. Devi feels that Murali sings well, so she registers his name in a singing competition. At the singing competition, Murali sees his father Gangadharan in the audience. His father started in a new life and married a rich bride, he is now a business magnate. His father turns out to be Rishi's father too. Murali wins the competition, and becomes a playback singer, he wins many awards and he is now the most successful of Tamil cinema. Murali finally reveals to Rishi that he is in love with Devi. In the end, during the marriage of Murali and Devi, Murali recognises the love between Rishi and Devi. He sacrifices his love and gets them married.

Cast 

S. P. Balasubrahmanyam as Murali/Bubly Mass
Rahman as Rishi
Lavanya Rajesh as Devi
Janagaraj as Rangarajan
Kalyan Kumar as Devi's father
Mohan Natarajan as Gangadharan
Chinni Jayanth as Romeo
Srividya as Rishi's mother
C. R. Saraswathi as Devi's mother
Sabitha Anand as Janaki
Kavithalaya Krishnan
Typist Gopu as Naidu
Master Kiran Pradeep
Baby Divya as Divya
Master Pradeep
Bonda Mani
Khushbu in a guest appearance
M. S. Viswanathan as himself (cameo appearance)
Gangai Amaran as himself (cameo appearance)

Soundtrack 
The film score and the soundtrack were composed by Ilaiyaraaja, with lyrics written by Vaali.

Reception 
Thulasi of Kalki found Ilayaraja's music, art direction, costumes and cinematography as positives but called the story and unnecessary stunt as drawbacks.

References

External links 
 

1990s Tamil-language films
1995 directorial debut films
1995 films
1995 romantic drama films
Films scored by Ilaiyaraaja
Indian romantic drama films